Peter Vorderer, Prof. Dr. phil. (born 1959 in Mannheim) is a German professor of media and Communication studies at the University of Mannheim focusing on the area of media psychology, entertainment research, and the social change related to the use of new media. He made major contributions to the field of mass communication, primarily in the area of media effects research. From May 2014 until May 2015, he was president of the International Communication Association (ICA).

Biography 
Peter Anton Vorderer was born in Mannheim in 1959. He began his studies of psychology at the University of Heidelberg in 1980, where he finished his degree in 1987. In 1983, he spent a year as a visiting PhD student of social psychology at New York University and the University of Michigan in Ann Arbor. He also earned a degree in sociology at the University of Mannheim in 1989.

During his time in Heidelberg, Vorderer was a close colleague to the psychologist and literary scholar Norbert Groeben, where they took a stand for the development of empirical literary studies and where Vorderer participated in the development of an analytical technique (the "Heidelberger Struktur-Lege-Technik"). He continued working in this field when he was a Research associate at the Institute of Communication, Music and Media Studies at the Technical University of Berlin from 1988 to 1993, which is where he achieved his PhD in 1992.

After his time in Berlin, he spent a year working as a visiting professor of Psychology at the University of Toronto. From 1994 to 2002, Vorderer assumed the professorship for Media studies at the Institute of Journalism and Communication Research at the Hanover University of Music, Drama and Media. Afterwards, he lectured as a professor of Communication at the Annenberg School for Communication and as a professor for Psychology at the College of Letters, Arts and Sciences within the University of Southern California in Los Angeles until 2007. During the time in California, Vorderer established his reputation as the world's leading scholar of Entertainment Research (within the field of Media Effects), collaborating with scholars like Dolf Zillmann, Jennings Bryant and others.

He was professor of communication science and chair of Department of Communication Science at the Free University of Amsterdam from 2007 until 2010 as well as scientific director of the "Center for Advanced Media Research Amsterdam" (CAMeRA). He then assumed the professorship of Media and communication studies at the Mannheim School of Humanities in 2010, which is where he is still currently teaching, doing research and publishing.

Vorderer was awarded "Yangtze River Scholar" by the Shanghai Jiao Tong University in China in 2015 for outstanding achievements in the research of new media and technological development. He was furthermore elected president of the International Communication Association (ICA) in early 2014.

Vorderer is father of two daughters.

Selected publications
 Zillmann, D. & Vorderer, P. (Eds.). (2000). Media entertainment: The psychology of its appeal. Mahwah, NJ: Lawrence Erlbaum Associates.  .
 Bryant, J. & Vorderer, P. (Eds.). (2006). Psychology of entertainment. Mahwah, NJ: Lawrence Erlbaum Associates. .
 Vorderer, P. & Kohring, M. (2013). Permanently Online: A Challenge for Media and Communication Research. International Journal of Communication, 7, Feature, 188–196. 
 Vorderer, P. & Reinecke, L. (2015). From Mood to Meaning: The changing model of the user in entertainment research. Communication Theory, 25(4), 447–453. http://dx.doi.org/10.1111/comt.12082

External links 
 Homepage for Peter Vorderer's faculty at the University of Mannheim 
 Biography of Vorderer as published on the page of the University of Mannheim
 Publications of Vorderer as published on the page of the University of Mannheim
 Vorderer's main research interests as published on his faculty's homepage
 Talk "Always on – always focussed?" for the DGPh in November 2016

References 

Living people
1959 births
Academic staff of the University of Mannheim
University of Mannheim
Heidelberg University alumni
Mannheim
Technical University of Berlin alumni
Hochschule für Musik, Theater und Medien Hannover alumni
University of Toronto alumni
University of Southern California alumni